Common mole may refer to:

 The eastern mole of North America (Scalopus aquaticus)
 The European mole or northern mole of Europe (Talpa europaea)

Animal common name disambiguation pages